The American Association of Physicians of Indian Origin (AAPI) is a professional association for Indian American physicians.

The association is based in Chicago and was founded in 1984. As of 2019, it claims a membership of 80,000 physicians.

Doctors of Indian origin
As of 2019, there were about 938,980 active physicians in the US; Indian-origin physicians account for at least 29.5% of the total physician population.

It is noteworthy that India provides the largest number of International Medical Graduates to the US in absolute numbers. More generally, India has been an important source of medical doctors for foreign countries since the 1960s.

Dr. Ravi Kolli, an eminent Psychiatrist from Pittsburgh, PA is the present president of the American Association of Physicians of Indian Origin.

Jagdish Tytler controversy
In June 2004, AAPI became involved in a controversy for its invitation to Indian Minister for NRI Affairs Jagdish Tytler to be honored at a dinner gala.

Various human rights and Sikh groups threatened to hold demonstrations at the venue and the invitation to Jagdish Tytler was withdrawn. Tytler resigned from the Indian government after being indicted by the official Nanavati Commission of inciting mobs for violence.

Events

American Association of Physicians of Indian Origin organised 15th Annual Global Health Summit as part of 5th Azadi Ka Amrit Mahotsav initiative at Avasa Hotel, Hyderabad, India, during January'2022. Shri Venkaiah Naidu, Hon'ble Vice President of India, was the Chief Guest. At the summit the theme on the benefits of Yoga and Meditation on mental and emotional health was stressed.

References

External links
American Association of Physicians of Indian Origin
AAPIO website

Medical associations based in the United States
South Asian American organizations
Medical and health professional associations in Chicago
Organizations established in 1984
Overseas Indian organisations